Češenik (in older sources and locally: Čemšenik) is a settlement in the Municipality of Domžale in the Upper Carniola region of Slovenia.

Češenik Manor

Češenik Manor ( or graščina Češenik) stands at the north end of the settlement. It was built after 1581, when the previous structure burned down after a lightning strike. The manor was burned by the Partisans on March 16, 1944. The building was repaired after the war and converted into apartments.

References

External links 

Češenik on Geopedia

Populated places in the Municipality of Domžale